Exit Wounds: The Album is the soundtrack to Andrzej Bartkowiak's 2001 film Exit Wounds. It was released on March 20, 2001, four days after the film, through Blackground Records and Virgin Records with distribution via Warner Bros. Records, and consists primarily of hip hop music. The album composed of seventeen songs and features performances by the film star DMX, as well as Black Child, Drag-On, Ja Rule, Lady Luck, Mack 10, Memphis Bleek, Nas, Redman, Sheek Louch, Styles P, Three 6 Mafia, Trick Daddy, Trina, and WC among others. American rapper Christian "Yung Berg" Ward, then known as Iceberg, made his debut on this soundtrack on the track "Dog 4 Life".

The album peaked at number 8 on the Billboard 200 and at number 5 on the Top R&B/Hip-Hop Albums in the United States. It spawned a one charting single, "No Sunshine", which made it to #67 on the Hot R&B/Hip-Hop Songs. "No Sunshine" is used as the entrance music of former UFC Middleweight Champion Anderson Silva.

Track listing

Notes
Track #1 contains an interpolation of "Ain't No Sunshine" by Bill Withers

Charts

References

External links

2001 soundtrack albums
Action film soundtracks
Hip hop soundtracks
Virgin Records soundtracks
Albums produced by Bud'da
Albums produced by DJ Paul
Albums produced by Juicy J
Albums produced by Irv Gotti
Albums produced by Timbaland
Albums produced by Dame Grease